Serge Kabongo (born 28 March 1966) is a Congolese former professional boxer who competed from 1989 to 1996. As an amateur, he competed in the men's middleweight event at the 1988 Summer Olympics.

References

External links
 

1966 births
Living people
Democratic Republic of the Congo male boxers
Olympic boxers of the Democratic Republic of the Congo
Boxers at the 1988 Summer Olympics
Place of birth missing (living people)
Middleweight boxers